Southpark Seafood is a seafood restaurant in Portland, Oregon.

Description 
Southpark Seafood serves seafood in downtown Portland. The menu includes oysters on the half shell.

Keith Jellum's bronze sculpture of a fish, Transcendence, is installed on the restaurant's exterior.

History 
The restaurant began a series of remodels in 2016. Additionally, the business launched an oyster bar and virtual farm-to-table tours. Christopher Robertson became executive chef in 2017.

Reception 
Carrie Uffindell included Southpark in Eater Portland's 2019 list of "Primo Kid-Friendly Restaurants in Portland". The website's Jenni Moore included the business in a 2021 list of "12 Stellar Portland Seafood Restaurants". Southpark was also included in Eater Portland's 2022 overview of "Where to Eat and Drink in Downtown Portland".

See also

 List of seafood restaurants

References

External links 

 
 Southpark Seafood at Zomato

Seafood restaurants in Portland, Oregon
Southwest Portland, Oregon